The Old Magic is a 2011 album created by British singer-songwriter Nick Lowe. Publications such as Allmusic have released positive reviews, with critic Stephen Thomas Erlewine regarding the work as featuring "plenty of charm" and labeling Lowe a "crooner". In addition, Mojo placed the album at number thirty-one on its list of "Top 50 albums of 2011."

Track listing
All tracks composed by Nick Lowe except where noted.
 "Stoplight Roses" – 3:28
 "Checkout Time" – 2:52
 "House for Sale" – 3:41
 "Sensitive Man" – 2:52
 "I Read a Lot" – 3:17
 "Shame on the Rain" (Tom T. Hall) – 2:24
 "Restless Feeling" – 2:40
 "The Poisoned Rose" (Elvis Costello) – 4:46
 "Somebody Cares for Me" (Lowe, Geraint Watkins) – 2:50
 "You Don't Know Me at All" (Jeff West) – 3:06
 "'Til the Real Thing Comes Along" – 3:25

Personnel
 Nick Lowe - rhythm guitar
 Robert Treherne – drums
 Geraint Watkins – organ, piano
 Steve Donnelly – lead guitar
 Neil Brockbank – vibraphone, mixing
 Johnny Scott – guitar
 Matt Radford – double bass
with:
 Paul Carrack – backing vocals
 Anna Harvey – backing vocals
 Matt Holland – trumpet on 4, 5, flugelhorn on 4
 Bob Loveday – violin and viola on 1, 5, recorder on 1
 Rory McLeod – bass harmonica on 1
 Nick Payne - baritone saxophone on 9
 Ron Sexsmith – backing vocals
 Kate St. John – string synthesizer on 7
 Linnea Svensson – backing vocals on 7
 Jimmie Vaughan – guitar on 10
 Annie Whitehead – trombone on 10
 Martin Winning – tenor saxophone on 10
 Norman Bergen – the gift of the string chart on "I Read a Lot"

References

External links
 

2011 albums
Nick Lowe albums
Proper Records albums
Yep Roc Records albums